Bill Stinchcomb (born June 21, 1963) is an American actor. He is known for his roles in films The Chaperone (2011), Battleship (2012) and The Condemned 2 (2015).

Early life and education
Stinchcomb was raised in Sarasota, Florida. He started acting after a casting director approached him while shopping in Target with his children in Shreveport, Louisiana. He has been actively pursuing the dream ever since. Stinchcomb is a retired United States Air Force B-52 pilot and combat veteran of Operation Iraqi Freedom and Operation Enduring Freedom. When not acting, Stinchcomb is a 767 Captain for Delta Air Lines, based in NYC.

Career
Stinchcomb started acting after being approached by a casting director while shopping with his children in Shreveport, Louisiana. His first principal role was in the 2008 release "Private Valentine". He retired from the USAF Reserves after 20 years of service.

As a B-52 Aircraft Commander, he saw combat in both Operation Iraqi Freedom and Operation Enduring Freedom. When not acting, he works as a 767 Captain for a major airline in NYC. Believing "acting class is my batting practice", he studies whenever and wherever he can.

Filmography

External links

American male actors
1963 births
Living people